The 1998 Arizona Wildcats softball team represented the University of Arizona in the 1998 NCAA Division I softball season.  The Wildcats were coached by Mike Candrea, who led his thirteenth season.  The Wildcats finished with a record of 67–4.  They competed in the Pacific-10 Conference, where they finished first with a 27–1 record.

The Wildcats were invited to the 1998 NCAA Division I softball tournament, where they swept the Regional and then completed a run to the title game of the Women's College World Series where they fell to champion Fresno State.

Personnel

Roster

Coaches

Schedule

Ranking movements

References

Arizona
Arizona Wildcats softball seasons
Arizona Softball
Pac-12 Conference softball champion seasons
Women's College World Series seasons